The Louisville Xtreme are an indoor football team based in Louisville, Kentucky, with home games at the KFC Yum! Center.  They began play as the Kentucky Xtreme in the Continental Indoor Football League (CIFL) in 2013 and 2014. Midway through the 2014 CIFL season, the league removed the team's membership and the Xtreme temporarily suspended operations. After playing the 2015 season in the semi-professional Minor League Football Alliance (MLFA), the team rebranded as the Louisville Xtreme in 2017. In 2020, the Xtreme were added to the American Arena League (AAL) but cancelled its season citing the COVID-19 pandemic. For the 2021 season, the Xtreme were announced to be joining the National Arena League, but instead joined the Indoor Football League three months later.

The Xtreme were the first indoor football team in the Louisville area since the af2's Louisville Fire folded in 2008. The co-owners of the CIFL Xtreme were Victor Cole and Mario Urrutia. While in the CIFL, the Xtreme played their home games at Freedom Hall in Louisville, but was suspended by the league after Urrutia abandoned the team to join the Winnipeg Blue Bombers midseason. Cole remained the managing owner after the team was removed from the CIFL.

History
The Xtreme was organized in 2012 when Victor Cole and five other partners decided to use the money they had saved up from their tours in Afghanistan. The Kentucky Xtreme played in the Interstate Football League, winning the 2012 championship.  In 2012, the Xtreme played a preseason exhibition game against the Evansville Rage of the Continental Indoor Football League (CIFL), losing 26–56. After the 2012 CIFL season, the Xtreme played another exhibition game against the CIFL's Indianapolis Enforcers, where the Xtreme defeated the Enforcers 20–16.

CIFL: 2013–2014
In July 2012, the Xtreme announced that they would be playing at Freedom Hall in Louisville, Kentucky, and had officially joined the CIFL as an expansion team in the South Division for the 2013 season. The team named former Louisville Fire assistant coach Roy McMillen as their first head coach. The Xtreme went on to have 7–3 record and made the playoffs, where they lost the Erie Explosion 55–6 in the semifinal game.

The Xtreme returned to the CIFL in 2014. In August 2013, the Xtreme named LaKunta Farmer the team's second head coach after McMillen resigned. In November 2013, former Arena Football League Rookie of the Year Award winner Mario Urrutia joined the Xtreme ownership group and would also play on the team. They started the season 0–5, including two forfeit losses. After their second forfeit, the CIFL announced that the Xtreme had been suspended by the league and that affiliate teams would fill out the Xtreme's remaining road games. Following the season, the CIFL effectively ceased operations.

Semi-professional leagues: 2015–2020
In 2015, the Kentucky Xtreme played in the indoor/outdoor Minor League Football Alliance (MLFA). The team made it to the championship game, where they lost to the Toledo Thunder 7–6.

The team went dormant until it updated its team name to Louisville Xtreme in 2017. It then began to pursue joining a league in 2019 and played a game against the Indianapolis Enforcers, who had become a member on the American Arena League (AAL), and lost 40–6. The Xtreme were then accepted as an expansion team in the AAL for the 2020 season and named Mark Stoute head coach. The team withdrew from the 2020 season on March 13 before playing a game citing the COVID-19 pandemic. The AAL also ultimately cancelled its season due to the pandemic.

IFL: 2021
After the cancellation of the 2020 season, the Xtreme announced they were joining the National Arena League (NAL). On July 24, 2020, former NFL player Chris Redman, a Louisville native and resident, was named the team's new president, also taking an ownership interest in the team. On October 30, the NAL announced the team's league membership was terminated citing they did not present the league with a required letter of credit and did not want to participate in the 2021 season, but the team then announced it had joined the Indoor Football League (IFL) on November 6. On February 22, 2021, the Xtreme announced that they had signed a three-year lease to play their home games at the KFC Yum! Center.

The Xtreme were one of four teams to start the 2021 IFL season before the rest of the league on April 24. The team's June 12 home game against the Green Bay Blizzard was then postponed for undisclosed reasons. On June 14, 2021, the IFL terminated the Xtreme's membership after five games played due to failing to maintain the league's minimum obligations and did not finish the season.

Logos

Season-by-season results

Head coaches records

Seasons

2013

2013 standings

2013 regular season

2013 playoffs

2013 coaching staff

2013 final roster

2014

2014 standings

2014 regular season schedule

2014 coaching staff

2014 final roster

See also
 Sports in Louisville, Kentucky

References

External links
 Louisville Xtreme website

 
2012 establishments in Kentucky
2014 disestablishments in Kentucky
2020 establishments in Kentucky
National Arena League teams